Hermelín (from Czech for stoat, a small weasel relative whose fur turns white in the winter, due to its white color) is a type of Czech cheese that imitates camembert, with a coating of white mold. It originates from the town of Sedlčany in Central Bohemia and is sold throughout the Czech Republic under various brand names. In restaurants, the cheese is usually served marinated in oil (nakládaný), deep-fried in breadcrumbs (smažený), grilled (grilovaný), and with cranberry sauce.

See also
 Czech cuisine

References

Cow's-milk cheeses
Czech cheeses